Oxygen Towers (also known as Oxygen) are a cluster of three individual but interlinked residential towers in Manchester, England. The 110 m (359 ft), 32-storey Tower 1 is the tallest element, with Towers 2 and 3 having 16 and 10-storeys respectively. The buildings were designed by 5plus Architects and Tower 1 is the 13th-tallest building in Greater Manchester as of 2023.

History

Planning
Planning permission was originally granted in 2007 by Manchester City Council for a 35-storey tower by developer Time & Tide, before the developer fell into administration in 2008. In 2015, developer Property Alliance Group acquired the site and obtained consent for the three tower scheme in March 2016. The development comprises 372 apartments and 12 townhouses, within three individual towers of 32, 16 and 10 storeys linked by two lift shafts.

Construction
Construction of Oxygen Towers was started in 2018 by contractor Russell WBHO, topped out in 2020 and completed in 2021. It is located on a triangular site where Store Street meets Great Ancoats Street, with the third elevation facing onto the sloped Millbank Street. The change in levels means that the tallest part of the building, Tower 1, has two basement floors while Towers 2 and 3 have just one.

Facilities
Oxygen Towers includes a spa with 25 m (82 ft) pool, a gym, spin and yoga studio, cinema room, and residents' lounge.

See also
List of tallest buildings in the United Kingdom
List of tallest buildings and structures in Greater Manchester

References

Buildings and structures in Manchester
2021 establishments in England
Skyscrapers in Manchester
Residential skyscrapers in England
Apartment buildings in England
Residential buildings completed in 2021
Residential buildings in Manchester